G. R. Blane (1791–1821) was an employee of the East India Company in British India.

Ancestry 
George Rodney Blane was born in 1791 to Sir Gilbert Blane, and died aged 30 years on 1 May 1821.

Education 
Blane was educated at Charterhouse School, and in 1804 (aged 13 years) he joined the Royal Military College, Marlow as a cadet of the East India Company.

Career at East India Company 
He had joined the department of line but due to his excellence in mathematics he was transferred to the ordinance department where he attracted the positive attention of Prime Minister William Pitt the Younger. After completing his education at Woolwich in 1807, aged 16 years he arrived in India to serve in the Bengal Engineers, part of the East India Company’s Bengal Army and predecessors of the Indian Army Corps of Engineers  Bengal Engineer Group. He surveyed Cuttack, Nepal, foothills of Himalaya and he desilted and remodeled Western Yamuna Canal. His assistant 1820-1821 was Ensign Edmund Swetenham of the Bengal Engineers.

Western Yamuna Canal 

The earlier Prithviraj Chauhan era or possibly earlier, pre-existing canal was dug out and renovated in 1335 CE by Firuz Shah Tughlaq, excessive silting caused it to stop flowing in 1750 CE, the British raj undertook a three-year renovation and remodeling of Western Yamuna Canal in 1817 by Blane or Bengal Engineer Group, he died in 1821 CE and in 1832-33 Tajewala Barrage dam at Yaumna was built to regulate the flow of water.

See also 

 Indira Gandhi Canal
 Irrigation in India 
 Indian Rivers Inter-link
 Inland waterways of India
 Ganges Canal
 Ganges Canal (Rajasthan)
 Upper Ganges Canal Expressway

References 

1791 births
1821 deaths
People educated at Charterhouse School
Graduates of the Royal Military College, Sandhurst
British East India Company Army officers
Canals in Haryana
Irrigation in Haryana
Canals in Hisar district
Bengal Engineers officers